Michel von Tell (8 October 1980) is a Swiss journalist, consultant and racing driver.

Life
He was a professional baseball player in the Swiss NLB league.
Miche Von Tell studied economics and was active in the financial investment sector. In 2012 he sold most of his companies and began to work in media. Since 2020 von Tell worked as a consultant in the German Parliament (Bundestag).

He occasionally participates in Poker tournaments and appears to be, according to the "Swiss Money List" by HedonMob, among the best 100 Players in the country (place 70).

His podcast recorded more than 10 million views and he was listed in the 100 most important European Youtubers by the biggest Lifestyle Magazine of Germany Top Magazin (Place 30).

In 2013 he did a documentary with Peter Scholl-Latour and worked together with him in some projects. Also he did the last big Interview with Scholl-Latour which died in 2014. Scholl-Latour was one of the most famous european journalists for over a half century,  comparable to Walter Cronkite in the USA.

Motorsport

During 2000 Michel von Tell placed sixth at the Rwanda Mountain Rally on Toyota. The Rwanda Mountain Gorilla Rally known originally as the Fraternity Rally and is an international rally event by WRC.

In 2020 he made a world record on the first electric Harley Davidson (Lifewire). 
He drove 1724 km (1070 Miles) in less than 24 hours. His ride went through four countries, more than 400 km more than the old record witch was 1316 km . He started in Switzerland over Germany to Austria and finished the record in the Microstate Liechtenstein.
The ride was accompanied by an audience, a Harley team from the local press and 6 independent judge observers which documented the record officially. The record obtained huge attention all over the world and is still unbroken as of 2022.

Michel von Tell was part at the Eco Grand Prix in Team Porsche.
At the 24 hours Grand Prix of Nürburgring he started on the new Porsche Taycan. The first full electric car by Porsche.

References

External links

EWRC Racing Profile
Poker Database HedonMob
Swiss Films

Swiss motorcycle racers
Living people
Year of birth missing (living people)